Mazanovo is a rural locality (a selo) in Mazanovsky Selsoviet of Mazanovsky District, Amur Oblast, Russia. The population was 641 as of 2018. There are 14 streets.

Geography 
Mazanovo is located on the left bank of the Zeya River, 8 km west of Novokiyevsky Uval (the district's administrative centre) by road. Beloyarovo is the nearest rural locality.

References 

Rural localities in Mazanovsky District